St. Augustine Catholic Church and Cemetery may refer to:

St. Augustine Catholic Church and Cemetery (Natchez, Louisiana), listed on the National Register of Historic Places in Natchitoches Parish, Louisiana
St. Augustine Catholic Church and Cemetery (Hartland, Michigan), listed on the National Register of Historic Places in Livingston County, Michigan
St. Augustine Catholic Church and Cemetery (Trenton, Wisconsin), listed on the National Register of Historic Places in Washington County, Wisconsin
St Augustine's Catholic Church, Salisbury, listed as St Augustines Catholic Church and Cemetery (former) on the Register of the National Estate, in Salisbury, South Australia